Joshua Norwood Jasper (born November 26, 1987) is an American football placekicker who is currently a free agent.

He set the Tennessee state record for career high school field goals, with 44, and his longest field goal was 54 yards. In 2010, he was a Consensus College All-American placekicker for the LSU Tigers in his senior year, after leading the nation with 28 field goals. He had the best placekicking percentage in LSU history as of 2011. In July 2011, the Tampa Bay Buccaneers signed him as a free agent.

Early years
Jasper was born in Memphis, Tennessee.  He played football and soccer at Ridgeway High School in Memphis.  Originally, he was a quarterback and wide receiver, before moving over to kicker for his junior and senior years.  He was rated the No. 12 kicker in the U.S. by Scout.com as a senior.  His longest field goal as a high schooler was 54 yards  and he set the state's record for total career field goals, with 44.

College career
Jasper attended Louisiana State University, where he played for coach Les Miles's LSU Tigers football team from 2007 to 2010. He completed  47 of 56 field goal attempts as a Tiger (83.9%), the best percentage in team history, and the second best in Southeastern Conference (SEC) history.

During his junior season in 2009, he tied for the third-longest field goal in LSU history, at 52 yards.  In a spring game, he kicked a 57-yard field goal.  He also set a school record in September 2010 with five field goals in one game, against Mississippi State, while tying the school record of 17 kicking points in one game.

During his senior season in 2010, he led the country with twenty-eight field goals.  He was recognized as a consensus first-team All-American placekicker, after receiving first-team honors from the Football Writers Association of America and Sporting News.  In addition to kicking field goals, he punted as LSU's "pooch punter", kicked kickoffs, and rushed a handful of times for first downs.  He was also a first-team All-SEC selection, the SEC Special Teams Player of the Week (vs. Mississippi State, vs. Ole Miss), and the Lou Groza Award Star of the Week (vs. Mississippi State, vs. Alabama, vs. UL-Monroe).  He capped his career by playing in the 2011 Senior Bowl.

Professional career
Despite his high school and college success, prognosticators were uncertain whether Jasper would be drafted in the April 2011 NFL Draft, as in the prior five years just nine kickers were drafted.  NFL draft analyst Mike Detillier opined that he might be a later-round draftee.

He was not picked in the draft. He had to wait until the NFL lockout ended before he could sign with a team as a free agent.

Tampa Bay Buccaneers
On July 26, 2011, Jasper said he had agreed to terms with the Tampa Bay Buccaneers on a rookie free agent deal. He was released on August 5.

Toronto Argonauts
On October 4, 2012, Jasper was signed by the Toronto Argonauts of the Canadian Football League.  He was released by the team on October 17, 2012.

New Orleans VooDoo
On November 19, 2013, Jasper was assigned to the New Orleans VooDoo of the Arena Football League.

Memphis Express
On August 21, 2018, Jasper signed with the Memphis Express of the Alliance of American Football. He was waived on February 27, 2019.

References

External links
 Toronto Argonauts bio
 LSU Tigers bio

1987 births
Living people
All-American college football players
American football placekickers
LSU Tigers football players
Memphis Express (American football) players
New Orleans VooDoo players
Players of American football from Memphis, Tennessee
Tampa Bay Buccaneers players